The 1986–87 season was the 41st season in Rijeka’s history and their 25th season in the Yugoslav First League. Their 5th place finish in the 1985–86 season meant it was their 13th successive season playing in the Yugoslav First League.

Competitions

Yugoslav First League

Results summary

Results by round

Matches

First League

Source: rsssf.com

Yugoslav Cup

Source: rsssf.com

UEFA Cup

Source: worldfootball.net

Squad statistics
Competitive matches only.

See also
1986–87 Yugoslav First League
1986–87 Yugoslav Cup
1986–87 UEFA Cup

References

External sources
 1986–87 Yugoslav First League at rsssf.com
 Prvenstvo 1986.-87. at nk-rijeka.hr

HNK Rijeka seasons
Rijeka